Shenyang Taoxian International Airport  is an airport serving Shenyang, capital of Liaoning province. It is a focus city for China Southern Airlines and is the 23rd busiest airport in China with 19,027,398 passengers as of 2018.

Lufthansa offered the first intercontinental service out of Shenyang, to Frankfurt, Germany, in April 2012 but discontinued it on 28 October 2016 before relaunching it on 27 March 2018. Later in 2012, Sichuan Airlines launched service to Vancouver.

History 

Construction started on 1 July 1985, and the airport opened on 16 April 1989, and was the main hub of China Northern Airlines, which started operating a year later.

Before the airport existed, was the main airport of Shenyang, built in 1921, served destinations to USSR, Mongolia, Japan, South Korea, North Korea, and hence, domestically. However, although it was expanded several times and having a long enough runway to support narrow-body airliners, it is no longer able to accommodate more tourists and passengers, as because of the reform and opening up, passenger tourists, whether local or foreign, were rising steeply. As a result, Taoxian airport was built and opened on 1989 and Dongta Airport ceased civil operations, and reverted to military use (by the Inperial Japanese 1936 to 1945 and PLAAF after 1950) until 2013.

Airlines and destinations

Passenger

Cargo

Ground transportation
The airport is served by the Shenyang Tram line 2 and line 6.

See also
List of airports in China
China's busiest airports by passenger traffic

References

External links
 
 Official web site

Airports in Liaoning
Transport in Shenyang
Airports established in 1989